Gaj is a village in municipality of Vrbovec in Zagreb County, Croatia.

References

Populated places in Zagreb County